Carlo Fecia di Cossato (S 519) was a of the Italian Navy.

Construction and career
Carlo Fecia di Cossato was laid down at Fincantieri Monfalcone Shipyard on 15 November 1975 and launched on 16 November 1977. She was commissioned on 5 November 1979.

She was decommissioned on 30 April 2002. From 1 April 2005, she began disarmament while moored at La Spezia and she is expected to undergo restoration where she will be transferred to Trieste serve as a museum ship in their old port. The sister submarine, Nazario Sauro was destined for a similar role and was transferred on 18 September 2009 to be exhibited at the Galata - Museum of the sea in Genoa as an integral part of the museum.

Citations

External links
 

1977 ships
Sauro-class submarines
Ships built by Fincantieri